Sinthusa peregrinus is a butterfly of the family Lycaenidae. It is endemic to Palawan in the Philippines.

References

peregrinus
Butterflies described in 1889
Butterflies of Asia
Taxa named by Otto Staudinger